Alisyn Lane Camerota (born June 21, 1966) is an American broadcast journalist and political commentator. She currently hosts CNN Tonight from 10–11 pm. She formerly was anchor of CNN's morning show New Day, a co-host of the afternoon edition of CNN Newsroom, as well as a presenter at Fox News. Camerota has covered stories nationally and internationally and has twice been nominated for an Emmy Award for news reporting.

Camerota covered the aftermath of Hurricane Harvey in Houston, the Paris and Brussels terror attacks and the Parkland school shooting. She interviewed the Parkland student survivors and representatives of the National Rifle Association in the hours after the shooting. Camerota has held dozens of panels with Donald Trump supporters, and is a frequent critic of Trump. Camerota has also covered the Me Too movement.

Outside of her role anchoring New Day, Camerota anchored a number of primetime specials, including Tipping Point: Sexual Harassment in America and The Hunting Ground: Sexual Assault on Campus.

Prior to joining CNN, Camerota worked for many years at Fox News, most notably as part of the Fox & Friends franchise and as co-host of Fox & Friends Weekend. Her first novel, Amanda Wakes Up, about an idealistic young journalist who finds herself with a plum spot at a cable news channel during a crazy presidential race was published by Viking in 2017 and was selected by NPR as one of the best books of the year, and by O, The Oprah Magazine as "a must read."

Biography

Education
Camerota graduated from the School of Communication of the American University in Washington, D.C. with a degree in broadcast journalism.

Early broadcasting career
Before joining Fox, Camerota worked at a number of different stations, including WHDH in Boston and WTTG in Washington D.C., and for America's Most Wanted. She also worked on Ted Koppel's primetime documentaries at Koppel Communications.

Fox News
Camerota joined the network in February, 1998 as a correspondent for its Boston bureau, reporting on a number of different stories and contributing to the network's affiliate service, Fox News Edge.

In October 2007, Camerota started a blog on the Fox & Friends page on Fox News Channel's website called In The Greenroom. In November 2007, Fox & Friends began an Internet-only segment, "The After the Show Show", which featured Fox & Friends anchors Brian Kilmeade, Steve Doocy and Gretchen Carlson, sometimes along with earlier guests or crew members from the cable show and a toy monkey at the end of the Internet segment. These videos are available later on the Fox & Friends page on Fox News Channel's website. Camerota was a co-host of the weekend edition of this program, in addition to regularly appearing on the Friday edition of Fox & Friends 1st.

Camerota began co-hosting America's News Headquarters with Bill Hemmer on September 30, 2013, in the Monday to Friday 1:00 p.m. - 2:00 p.m. ET time slot.  She also co-hosted Fox & Friends Weekend along with Clayton Morris and Dave Briggs. Her final broadcast on that program was September 28, 2013.  She was also a co-host on Fox & Friends First.

At the end of the afternoon broadcast on March 14, 2014, Camerota marked the end of her 16-year run with the network in a farewell to her afternoon audience.

Camerota, who was sexually harassed by Fox News chairman and CEO Roger Ailes, is briefly portrayed by Tricia Helfer in the movie Bombshell.

CNN
On July 14, 2014, CNN and CNN International announced that Camerota had joined the CNN news team to serve as a TV anchor with a time slot to be announced. She co-anchored on CNN's New Day the morning of Friday, July 25, 2014 and Monday, August 25, 2014 and in 2015 became a permanent co-anchor of New Day, whose viewership reportedly increased by 9 percent after she was added to the program.

On Monday, April 19, 2021, Camerota began co-hosting CNN Newsroom from 2-4 pm with Victor Blackwell.

In September of 2022, Camerota was selected to serve as an interim host of CNN Tonight along with Jake Tapper and Laura Coates throughout the 2022 midterm elections where she helmed the 10 p.m. hour.  

In January of 2023 she was selected to permanently host the 10 p.m. hour of CNN Tonight.

Amanda Wakes Up
Camerota wrote Amanda Wakes Up, a novel she began writing while taking notes of her interviews of candidates in the 2012 presidential election. The notes developed into a novel based on her 25 years of working for the news business. She wrote the book with the desire to remind readers of the importance of real journalism. Book reviewer Lincee Ray of the Associated Press wrote that the novel offers "a healthy dose of what it means to weigh ambition against truth".

Personal life
Camerota is of Italian American heritage. A native of Shrewsbury, New Jersey she and her husband have fraternal twin daughters conceived via in-vitro fertilization in 2005 and a son who was conceived naturally in 2007. In 2010, she appeared on The Today Show to discuss her infertility issues and served as host of the National Infertility Associations "Night of Hope Celebration." The couple lives in Westport, Connecticut.

See also
 New Yorkers in journalism

References

External links

CNN Profile

American reporters and correspondents
American University School of Communication alumni
Living people
1966 births
Fox News people
CNN people
People from Shrewsbury, New Jersey
21st-century American novelists
American women novelists
American women non-fiction writers
21st-century American non-fiction writers
21st-century American women writers
American writers of Italian descent